The Australian women's cricket team toured New Zealand in February 2016. The tour included a series of three WODIs and three WT20Is. The WODIs were part of both the Rose Bowl series and 2014–16 ICC Women's Championship. Australia won the ODI series by 2–1 and New Zealand took the T20I series by 2–1.

Squads

ODI series
The three match series is part of both Rose Bowl series and 2014–16 ICC Women's Championship.

1st ODI

2nd ODI

3rd ODI

T20I series

1st T20I

2nd T20I

3rd T20I

References 

International cricket competitions in 2015–16
2014–16 ICC Women's Championship
2016 in women's cricket
2015–16 Australian women's cricket season
2016 in New Zealand cricket
New Zealand 2016
Australia 2016
cricket
February 2016 sports events in New Zealand
March 2016 sports events in New Zealand